Jacopo Francesco Riccati (28 May 1676 – 15 April 1754) was a Venetian mathematician and jurist from Venice. He is best known for having studied the equation which bears his name.

Education
Riccati was educated first at the Jesuit school for the nobility in Brescia, and in 1693 he entered the University of Padua to study law. He received a doctorate in law (LL.D.) in 1696. Encouraged by Stefano degli Angeli to pursue mathematics, he studied mathematical analysis.

Career
Riccati received various academic offers but declined them in order to devote his full attention to the study of mathematical analysis on his own. Peter the Great invited him to Russia as president of the St. Petersburg Academy of Sciences. He was also invited to Vienna as an imperial councillor and was offered a professorship at the University of Padua. He declined all these offers.

He was often consulted by the Senate of Venice on the construction of canals and dikes along rivers.

Some of his work on multinomials was included by Maria Gaetana Agnesi, at Riccati's request, in the book on integral calculus of her Analytical Institutions.

The Riccati equation is named after him.

Personal life
His father, Conte Montino Riccati, came from a noble family who owned land near Venice. His mother was from the powerful Colonna family. His father died in 1686, when Riccati was only ten, leaving the youth a handsome estate.

Jacopo's son, Vincenzo Riccati, a Jesuit, followed his father's footsteps and pioneered the development of hyperbolic functions.

A second son, Giordano Riccati was the first to measure the ratio of Young's moduli of metals—preceding the better known Thomas Young by 25 years.

Honors
Jacopo Riccati was named honorary Academician of the Academy of Sciences of the Institute of Bologna in 1723.

Notes and references

Works

External links

1676 births
1754 deaths
Republic of Venice scientists
17th-century Italian mathematicians
18th-century Italian mathematicians